The Peach Drop is a New Year's Eve event held in Atlanta, Georgia. Traditionally held in Underground Atlanta, the event features the lowering of a large peach sculpture down a  tower, symbolizing Georgia's identity as the "Peach State".

The event was held in Underground Atlanta from 1989 to 2017, and then moved to Woodruff Park for 2018 before returning to Underground Atlanta for 2019. The event was cancelled for 2020 due to the sale of Underground Atlanta and other logistical issues, as well as 2021 and 2022 due to the COVID-19 pandemic. The event successfully returned for 2023.

History
From 1989 through 2017, the event was held at Underground Atlanta.

The Drop was moved to the Flatiron Building for the 2018 celebration with festivities held at Woodruff Park after Underground Atlanta was sold to a private developer. For 2019, the event returned to Underground Atlanta.

Hiatus
The 2020 Peach Drop was cancelled for in order to re-evaluate and expand the event. Mayor Keisha Lance Bottoms stated that the sale of Underground Atlanta complicated the event, and previous year's return for 2019 lacked "the thought and consideration and resources we should give an event." The 2021 and 2022 Peach Drop events were cancelled for the second and third consecutive years due to the COVID-19 pandemic. However, the Peach Drop is scheduled to return to Underground Atlanta for 2023.

See also 

 List of objects dropped on New Year's Eve

References

External links

New Year in the United States
Culture of Atlanta
Tourist attractions in Atlanta
Peaches